The Hennessey Viper Venom 1000TT (Twin Turbo) is an upgraded version of the Dodge Viper produced by Hennessey Performance Engineering, also known as HPE, that can be purchased as a complete car or as an upgrade package. The car can be had as a coupe or a convertible. It has a theoretical maximum production run of 24 vehicles.

Performance
The engine has been stroked from 8.3 to 8.55 liters, and has had the compression ratio lowered to 9.0:1. It also has been equipped with Twin Garrett ball bearing turbochargers and a front-mounted air-to-air intercooler.

Body
 VenomAero body modifications (front air dam, rear diffuser & spoiler)
 Lowered suspension
 2-way adjustable coilover shock absorbers
 Brembo upgraded braking system
 Adjustable traction control system
 Quaife differential
 Hennessey Venom 7R forged aluminum wheels (19x10 front, 20x13 rear)
 Michelin Pilot Sport 2 tyres: 275/30 YR19 front, 335/30 YR20 rear

Interior
 Limited edition leather interior with custom embroidery
Five-point harnesses
 HPE custom floor mats
 DVD navigation system

Legality
According to testing by Motor Trend in 2005, the Venom failed California emissions testing due to excess carbon monoxide, but is legal in the other 49 states. However, the car was tuned for a standing mile race on a closed circuit, Motor Trend surprised Hennessey with this emissions test, and the car only failed by a very small threshold, which could have easily been remedied with a less aggressive tune.

Performance
0-60 mph (97 km/h): 3.25 seconds

Top Speed: 

Road & Track 0-200 Shootout (Sept 07) Article
 0-200 mph: 25.3 s (street tires, not drag radials).

References

External links
 Video of the Venom
 2006 Road Test by Motor Trend

Sports cars
Cars of the United States
Hennessey vehicles